Chandrakanta is an Indian fantasy television series partly based on Devaki Nandan Khatri's 1888 novel of the same name. It was originally telecast on DD National between 1994 and 1996 and was created, written, produced, and directed by Nirja Guleri. The serial was pulled off air by Doordarshan in 1996 and the producers had to file a suit in court for reinstatement. Reruns of the show also aired on Star Plus and Sony Entertainment Television.

Cast and characters

 Pankaj Dheer as Shivdutt- King of Chunargarh
 Shahbaz Khan as Kunwar Virendra Vikram Singh
 Shikha Swaroop as Princess Chandrakanta
 Mukesh Khanna as Janbaaz and Meghavat

 Javed Khan as Tej Singh

 Irrfan Khan as Badrinath / Somnath (twin brothers)
 Akhilendra Mishra as Kroor Singh, popularly known as Yakkoo
 Kausambi Ganguly as Devsena
 Mamik Singh as Surya / Deva
 Nimai Bali as Surya (original)
 Vijayendra Ghatge as Sumer Singh
 Parikshit Sahni as Maharaja Surendra Singh (King of Naugarh)
 Durga Jasraj as Rani Kalavati
 Rajendra Gupta as Pandit Jagannath / Shani (twin brothers)
 Krutika Desai Khan as twin sisters Sabhya and Ramya, Amba (Vishkanya), and Jwala, the dacoit
 Sonika Gill as Amrapali, Amba's mother
 Anu Dhawan as Tara (Vishkanya)
 Kalpana Iyer as Dum Dumi Maai. Iyer also plays Sultana, an ally of Tara
 Rupal Patel as Jamuna, who is a cousin sister of Roopmati, a villain
 Vinod Kapoor as Amarjeet Singh / Barkat Khan
 Brownie Parashar as Ajgar
 Aasif Sheikh as Naagmani Devata (Snake King)
 Surendra Pal as King of Vijaygarh
 Pradeep Rawat as Himmat Singh
 Arun Mathur as Vaidh Baba, Damini's father
 Deepak Parashar as Devdutt, Shivdutt's father
 Sudha Chandran as Satyavati, Shivdutt's mother
 Bhushan Jeevan as Dalpati Devata
 Roopa Ganguly as Damini, Vishwajeet Singh's mother
 Vaquar Shaikh as Vishwajeet Singh, the illegal son of Raja Surendra Singh and Damini.
 Brahmachari as Nazim Aiyyar
 Arjun (Firoz Khan) as the magician mentor of Vishvajeet Singh
 Syed Badr-ul Hasan Khan Bahadur
 Varsha Usgaonkar as Roopmati Naagraani.
 Ashalata Kashmiri as Shivdutt's Daya Maa

Criticism
Kamlapati Khatri, the grandson of the novel's author, has said that the producer "had not done justice to the soul of Khatri's Chandrakanta". He has also accused the producers of willfully misrepresenting certain concepts from the novel, such as "tilism" (kind of a maze) and "ayyari" (spying), and showing them as "jadu-tona" (sorcery), as well as criticizing the characters and the sequences in the Chunar fort for being overly exaggerated, and how far into the show Chandrakanta appeared.

References

External links

Official Site on Sony TV

Indian fantasy television series
Television shows based on Indian novels
1994 Indian television series debuts
1996 Indian television series endings
DD National original programming
Television series about snakes
Television series about shapeshifting
Indian period television series